Beau may refer to:

Beau (name), a list of people and fictional characters with the given name, nickname or surname
Beau (guitarist) (born 1946), songwriter and 12-string guitar specialist
Beau (grape), another name for the Italian wine grape Trebbiano
"Beau" (poem), a poem by James Stewart
The Beau, a short-lived Irish literary journal
Beau's All Natural Brewing Company, a Canadian microbrewery
"Beau", a synonym for boyfriend

See also
Beau Geste (disambiguation)
Beau Jack (1921–2000), American lightweight boxer born Sidney Walker
Beau Jocque (1953–1999), American zydeco musician born Andrus J. Espre
Beau Monga (born 1994), winner of New Zealand The X Factor
Beaux, a commune in France
Beaux (surname)
LeBeau (disambiguation)
Bo (disambiguation)
Bow (disambiguation)